Pierluigi Pizzaballa (born 14 September 1939) is a retired Italian footballer who played as a goalkeeper.

Club career
Pizzaballa started his club career with Atalanta B.C., where he became one of the Serie A's top Italian goalkeepers, before moving to A.S. Roma in 1966. He subsequently played for Hellas Verona F.C. and A.C. Milan, and he finished his career back at Atalanta, earning 275 appearances in Serie A. In his career he won 4 Coppa Italia trophies (one with Atalanta, one with Roma, and two with Milan), a Serie B title with Atalanta, and a European Cup Winners' Cup with Milan.

International career
Pizzaballa earned one cap for the Italy national football team on 18 June 1966, coming on as a substitute against Austria,  and was in the Italian squad at the 1966 FIFA World Cup, although he did not play a match in the competition, as he was a backup to Enrico Albertosi. Although he was considered one of the best Italian goalkeepers of his generation, he received little space with the national side due to the presence of many other notable goalkeepers during his time, in addition to Albertosi, such as Lorenzo Buffon, Fabio Cudicini, Carlo Mattrel, Roberto Anzolin, Giuliano Sarti, Lido Vieri, and Dino Zoff.

Personal life
In addition to his unique name, success and ability as a footballer, Pizzaballa also achieved fame throughout his career because of his iconic surname, and also as his Panini Italian footballing card was supposedly extremely difficult to obtain.

Honours

Club
Atalanta
Serie B: 1958–59
Coppa Italia: 1962–63

Roma
Coppa Italia: 1968–69

Milan
Coppa Italia: 1972–73, 1976–77
UEFA Cup Winners' Cup: 1972–73

References

External links
 

1939 births
Living people
Italian footballers
Italy international footballers
1966 FIFA World Cup players
Atalanta B.C. players
A.S. Roma players
Hellas Verona F.C. players
A.C. Milan players
Serie A players
Serie B players
Association football goalkeepers